The Fureys are an Irish folk band originally formed in 1974. The group consisted initially of four brothers who grew up in Ballyfermot, Dublin.

Brothers Eddie, Finbar, Paul and George Furey are of Irish Traveller heritage. Two of the band's singles have been number one hits in Ireland, and two of their albums charted in the United Kingdom. In collaborations with Davey Arthur, they have also been credited as The Fureys and Davey Arthur.

History

Background
Prior to the band's formation, two of the brothers toured as a duo, known simply by their names as Eddie and Finbar Furey. For a while in 1969–1970, the duo performed with The Clancy Brothers and appeared on two of the Irish folk group's albums. The second of these albums contained two songs composed by the Fureys, "Flowers in the Valley" and "Jennifer Gentle". In the meanwhile, their youngest brother Paul Furey had, together with Davey Arthur and Brendan Leeson, formed a band called The Buskers. Eddie and Finbar and the Buskers appeared together in Germany at the "Irish Folk Festival" in 1974, where they performed as The Furey Brothers. The Buskers, now with the addition of George Furey, appeared there again a year later as The Furey Family, when they were joined by their father Ted, a renowned traditional fiddler, who was 73 at that time. Ted Furey had recorded a solo fiddle album Toss the Feathers released by the Outlet label in 1967.

Band
Finbar, Eddie, and Paul Furey formed a folk group called Tam Linn in 1976 with Davey Arthur. When their brother George joined them later that year, the band changed its name to The Furey Brothers and Davey Arthur. They eventually simplified their name to The Fureys and Davey Arthur (and just The Fureys when Arthur did not perform with them).

In 1981, The Fureys released their most successful single "When You Were Sweet Sixteen", which became a worldwide hit, reaching No. 14 on the UK Singles Chart, No. 1 on the Irish Singles Chart and No. 9 on the Australian Singles Chart. "The Green Fields of France" (a title commonly but incorrectly given to Eric Bogle's "No Man's Land") also gave them an Irish No. 1, remaining in the single charts for twenty eight weeks.  They also had two Top 40 British albums called Golden Days and At the End of the Day.

Other notable songs include "Gallipoli", "The Red Rose Cafe", and "Steal Away". As of October 24, 2019 the band was still recording and touring. In 2018, the band celebrated their 40th anniversary.

Finbar left the band to begin his own solo career in 1996, with Eddie, George, and Davey Arthur continuing some touring in Ireland, the UK and the European continent. Paul Furey died suddenly in June 2002.

All four of the brothers married and had children. Finbar's son, Martin Furey, is a folk singer and musician with The High Kings. George's son Anthony is the singer with the Young Folk. Eddie's daughter Sarah-Jane is a streamer in the video gaming industry.

Discography

Ted Furey and Brendan Byrne
Toss The Feathers, Outlet, 1967

Eddie and Finbar Furey
Finbar and Eddie Furey, Transatlantic, 1968
The Lonesome Boatman, Transatlantic, 1969
The Dawning of the Day, Dawn, 1972
Four Green Fields, Pläne, 1972
A Dream in My Hand, Intercord, 1974
I Live Not Where I Love, Intercord, 1975
The Farewell Album, Intercord, 1976
I Know Where I'm Going, 1976, (with Paddie Bell)
The Town Is Not Their Own, HPE, 1981
Finbar and Eddie Furey, Harp, 1982

The Clancy Brothers (with Finbar and Eddie Furey)
Christmas, Columbia, 1969
Flowers in the Valley, Columbia, 1970

Finbar Furey
Traditional Irish Pipe Music, Transatlantic, 1969
The Irish Pipes of Finbar Furey, Nonesuch, 1972
Peace & Enjoyment, Love & Pleasure (with Brian McNeill)
Prince of Pipers, Intercord, 1974
Sweetest Summer Rain
The Finbar Furey Songbook
Love Letters, BMG, 1990
The Wind and the Rain, Nora, 1997
Chasing Moonlight, Hybrid, 2003
New York Girls, Rough Diamond, 2003, (EP)
The Last Great Lovesong, Pinorekk, 2014

Ted Furey
Irish Folk Music, Arfolk, 1972

The Buskers
Life of a Man, Rubber Records, 1973
The Buskers, Hawk, 1974

The Fureys and Bob Stewart
Tomorrow We Part, Crescent, 1976
Aran: Celtic Gypsy Music, 1999

The Furey Family
The Furey Family, Intercord, 1977

The Fureys and Davey Arthur
Emigrant, Polydor, 1977Morning on a Distant Shore, Polydor, 1977Banshee, Dolby, 1978The Green Fields of France, Banshee, 1979The Sound of the Fureys and Davey Arthur, Polydor, 1980When You Were Sweet Sixteen, Banshee, 1982Steal Away, Banshee, 1983In Concert, RTÉ, 1983Golden Days, K-Tel, 1984At The End of the Day, K-Tel, 1985The First Leaves of Autumn, 1986Red Rose Café/Irish Eyes/Sitting Alone, 1987,(EP)Dublin Songs, 1988Poor Man's Dream, 1988The Scattering, 1988AlcoholidaysThe Best of the Fureys and Davey Arthur, 1993

The FureysWind of Change, Shanachie, 1992Claddagh Road, 1994May We All Someday Meet Again, 1996Twenty One Years On, 1999The Essential Fureys, 2001The Fureys Sing Chaplin, 2001My Father's House, 2003I Will Love You, 200325th Anniversary Collection, 2003My Father's House, 2005The Times They Are a Changing'' 2014

References

External links

Discography at TheBalladeers.com

Irish folk musical groups
Musical groups from Dublin (city)
Transatlantic Records artists